Sabine refers to:
 The Sabines tribe, an Italic tribe of ancient Italy, their territory, which still bears the ancient tribe's name, and their language.

People

 Sabine (given name)
 Sabine (surname)

Places

Antarctica
 Sabine Glacier, a glacier in Graham Land, Antarctica

Australia
Sabine, Queensland, a locality in Toowoomba Region

Canada
 Cape Sabine, land point on Pim Island, in Qikiqtaaluk Region, Nunavut
 Sabine Channel Provincial Park, a provincial park in British Columbia
 Sabine Island (Nunavut), an island in the Canadian Arctic
 Sainte-Sabine, Chaudière-Appalaches, Quebec, a municipality in the Chaudière-Appalaches region of Quebec
 Sainte-Sabine, Montérégie, Quebec, a municipality in the Brome-Missisquoi Regional County Municipality, Quebec

France
 Sainte-Sabine, a commune in the Côte-d'Or department in eastern France
 Sainte-Sabine-Born, a commune in the Dordogne department, southwestern France
 Sainte-Sabine-sur-Longève, a commune in the Sarthe department, Pays-de-la-Loire, north-western France

Greenland
 Sabine Island

Italy
 Sabina (region), also called the Sabine Hills or the Sabines

New Zealand
 Sabine River, New Zealand
 Travers-Sabine Circuit, a popular tramping route in Nelson Lakes National Park

Norway
 Sabine Land, a land area on the east coast of Spitsbergen, Svalbard

United States

Alaska
 Cape Sabine DEW Line Station, a former Distant Early Warning radar station

Kansas
 Sabine Hall (Garden City, Kansas), a historic building

Louisiana
 Sabine National Wildlife Refuge, in Cameron Parish in southwestern Louisiana, adjacent to Sabine Lake
 Sabine Parish, Louisiana
 Sabine Parish School Board
 Sabine Pass Light, a historic lighthouse in Cameron Parish

Tennessee
 Sabine Hill, a historic home in Elizabethton

Texas
 Sabine County, Texas
 Sabine Lake, a salt water estuary on the Texas-Louisiana border
 Sabine National Forest, in East Texas
 Sabine Pass, the natural outlet of Sabine Lake into the Gulf of Mexico
 First Battle of Sabine Pass
 Second Battle of Sabine Pass
 Sabine Pass Battleground State Historic Site, in Jefferson County, where the Sabine River enters the Gulf of Mexico
 Sabine Pass, Port Arthur, Texas, a neighborhood of Port Arthur
 Sabine Pass Independent School District, a public school district in Sabine Pass, Port Arthur
 Sabine River (Texas-Louisiana)
 Big Sandy Creek (Sabine River), tributary of the Sabine River in northeastern Texas

West Virginia
 Sabine, West Virginia, an unincorporated community in Wyoming County

Vermont
 Sabine Field, sports stadium in Northfield

Virginia
 Sabine Hall (Tappahannock, Virginia), a historic building near Warsaw, Virginia

Animals
 Sabine shiner (Notropis sabinae), a fish
 Sabine's gull (Xema sabini), a bird
 Sabine's puffback (Dryoscopus sabini), a bird
 Sabine's spinetail (Rhaphidura sabini), a bird

Entertainment
 Sabine, fictional character in The Order of the Stick, a webcomic
 Sabine Strohem, fictional character from the Griffin and Sabine series by Nick Bantock
 Sabine Cheng, a character in the animated series Miraculous: Tales of Ladybug & Cat Noir
 Sabine Wren, a fictional character from the Star Wars Rebels TV series
 Sabine (TV series), a German television series

Education
 West Sabine Independent School District, a public school district based in Pineland, Texas, United States
 West Sabine High School, a public secondary school located in Pineland

Military and defense
 Sabine Expedition, a volunteer expedition to protect the US/Mexico border in 1806
 Sabine-Southwestern War, a military conflict in the United States from 1836 to 1837
 , two US Navy ships named after the Sabine River along the Texas/Louisiana border
 , a sailing frigate in service during the American Civil War
 , a United States Navy fleet oiler, launched in 1940

Other uses
 Sabine (crater), a lunar crater
 665 Sabine, a minor planet
 Sabine (olive), olive grown in Corsica
 SABINE Inc., manufacturer of professional audio equipment, e. g. Electronic tuner#Types AX3000
 Sabine River and Northern Railroad, a freight railroad in Texas, United States
 William H. Sabine House, a historic house in Syracuse, New York, United States
 Storm Sabine in north-western Europe in February 2020

See also
 Sabina (disambiguation)
 Sainte-Sabine (disambiguation)